Susan "Sue" Crehan (born 12 September 1956) is a British long-distance runner. She competed in the women's marathon at the 1988 Seoul Olympics, finishing 32nd.

International competitions

References

1956 births
Living people
Athletes (track and field) at the 1988 Summer Olympics
British female long-distance runners
British female marathon runners
Olympic athletes of Great Britain
Place of birth missing (living people)